Aatram Dharamraobaba Bhagwantrao is an Indian leader of Nationalist Congress Party and a member of the Maharashtra Legislative Assembly elected from Aheri Assembly constituency in Gadchiroli city.

Positions held
 2019: Elected to Maharashtra Legislative Assembly.

References

Living people
Maharashtra MLAs 2019–2024
Nationalist Congress Party politicians from Maharashtra
People from Gadchiroli
Year of birth missing (living people)